The Bad Axe River is a  tributary of the Mississippi River in southwestern Wisconsin in the United States.  "Bad axe" is a translation from the French, "la mauvaise hache", but the origin of the name is unknown. The river's mouth at the Mississippi was the site of the Battle of Bad Axe, an 1832 U.S. Army massacre of Sauk and Fox Indians at the end of the Black Hawk War.

Course
The Bad Axe River flows for its entire length in western Vernon County, and for most of its length as two streams, the North Fork Bad Axe River and the South Fork Bad Axe River.

References

See also
List of Wisconsin rivers

Rivers of Wisconsin
Tributaries of the Mississippi River
Rivers of Vernon County, Wisconsin